Munshiram Singh is an Indian politician from the Samajwadi Party and member of the 15th Lok Sabha from Bijnor as member of Rashtriya Lok Dal.

External links
 Official biographical sketch in Parliament of India website

1965 births
Living people
Uttar Pradesh politicians
People from Bijnor
India MPs 2004–2009
People from Bijnor district